Jonas Glim is a fictional character in DC Comics. Jonas Glim first appeared in Lobo #1 (Dec 1993) and was created by Alan Grant and Val Semeiks.

Fictional character biography
Jonas was born on Manson's World. His father Jeremiah Glim drank, exploited and beat him, intending for Jonas to become a bounty hunter ever since Jonas' mother died. Jeremiah gave Jonas the Krupps 101, a weapon noted for its wide variety in firepower. Soon after, Jonas kills his father and becomes a bounty hunter anyway.

Jonas meets up with Lobo, as they both work for the same bounty hunter agency for a while. Their early adventures are marred with mistrust. During a search and retrieval of a Mafia accountant, Jonas doesn't want to turn his back on Lobo after the 'fiasco on Bwayne's Word'. The accountant, Vernon Z. Quigly becomes involved with Mort Fatale and the Dead Boys. This results in multiple battles between both sides. Eventually Lobo and Vernon take off in issue #3. Glim believes that Lobo has betrayed him again, leaving him to mafia soldiers. He survives this and later reestablishes a friendship with Lobo.

Together, they torment and beat the often-confused hero Goldstar; at one point they take advantage of his mental illness and turn him into a virtual slave. Around this time, Jonas suffers the loss of most of his left chin-tusk.

Jonas attends Lobo's birthday party, held at one of the many incarnations of Al's Diner, Al being one of the few people Lobo actually cares about (though he cares more for Darlene, Al's employee). Jonas' gift is in fact, two people Lobo had been hunting; delighted, Lobo kills them.

Jonas, Lobo and most of the birthday goers engage in drinking contests and random violence until Darlene and the hired birthday stripper, aggravated at being mistreated, end the party by holding everyone hostage for a while. Lobo burns down the diner, which was actually Al's gift to him.

Jonas is one of the few survivors of Lobo's trip to Apokolips during the "Genesis" incident.

At some point, when he is on friendly terms, Jonas Glim assists when Lobo finds a pleasing lead. It concerns a gang leader, the only man who has ever beaten Lobo in a fight. The criminal had hidden from Lobo in the time stream using a time-traveling bike. Lobo jumps through the time stream to alter the fight so he wins. This has the effect of changing Jonas into a frog-like creature. This set of circumstances does not last.

Powers and abilities
Jonas Glim possesses super-strength and can survive in the vacuum of space.

He is an expert at hand-to-hand combat and the use of firearms.

In other media

Television
 Jonas Glim appears in the Justice League Action episode "Follow That Space Cab!", voiced by Troy Baker. He was seen with Lobo when they take up a bounty from Boss Kack in capturing Mister Mind. During the mission, Lobo double-crosses Jonas and sends his vehicle off into another direction.

Novels
 Jonas makes a cameo in the novel DC Universe: Last Sons. He is, at the time of the novel, on friendly terms with Lobo and has just had his tusks polished.

References

External links
 Jonas Glim at DC Comics Wiki
 Jonas Glim at Comic Vine

Lobo (DC Comics)
Comics characters introduced in 1993
DC Comics male characters
Fictional bounty hunters
DC Comics aliens
DC Comics characters with superhuman strength